Kunibert Gensichen (26 June 1907 – 26 June 1991) was a German actor. He appeared in more than 60 films and television shows between 1937 and 1989.

Filmography

References

External links

1907 births
1991 deaths
German male film actors